Christopher Todd Massey (born November 21, 1979) is a former American football long snapper. He was drafted by the St. Louis Rams in the seventh round of the 2002 NFL Draft. He played college football at Marshall University. He has also played for the Carolina Panthers and Chicago Bears.

College years
Massey attended Marshall University and was a four-year starter at long snapper. He never missed a snap during his college career and added 12 tackles on coverage units, and 19 more as a senior linebacker. He graduated with a bachelor's degree in Criminal Justice in 2001 and completed a Master's in Sports Administration in 2009.

Professional career

St. Louis Rams

Massey was selected by the St. Louis Rams in the seventh round (243rd overall) in the 2002 NFL Draft. During his career he has made clean snaps on 702 out of 703 attempts including a run of 528 consecutive clean snaps.

He was released on August 22, 2011.

Carolina Panthers
On August 27, 2011, Massey signed with the Carolina Panthers, but was waived on August 30.

Chicago Bears
On November 24, 2011, Massey signed with the Chicago Bears to replace Patrick Mannelly, lost for the season and placed on injured reserve after rupturing his anterior cruciate ligament against the San Diego Chargers on November 20.

References

External links
 Chicago Bears bio

1979 births
Living people
American football long snappers
American football running backs
People from Kanawha County, West Virginia
Players of American football from West Virginia
Marshall Thundering Herd football players
St. Louis Rams players
Carolina Panthers players
Chicago Bears players